Nariakira (written: 斉彬, 成章) is a masculine Japanese given name. Notable people with the name include:

 (1852–1915), Japanese general
 (1738–1779), Japanese academic and linguist
 (1809–1858), Japanese daimyō

Japanese masculine given names